Teide 1 was the first brown dwarf to be verified, in 1995.

This object is more massive than a planet, but less massive than a star (0.0544 MSun). Its surface temperature is 2,600 ± 150 K, which is about half that of the Sun. Its luminosity is 0.08–0.05% of that of the Sun.

Discovery
Teide 1 was detected by Rafael Rebolo López, María R. Zapatero-Osorio and Eduardo L. Martín in optical images obtained in January 1994 with the 0.80 meter diameter telescope (IAC-80) from the Instituto de Astrofísica de Canarias, located at the Teide Observatory on the island of Tenerife. Its cold nature was confirmed in December 1994 with the William Herschel telescope (WHT) of the Roque de los Muchachos observatory in La Palma. On May 22, 1995, the article reporting their discovery was submitted to the journal Nature, which published it on September 14, 1995. Meanwhile, a similar object, Calar 3, was discovered. The brown dwarf nature of Teide 1 and Calar 3 was confirmed in 1996 following spectroscopic observations with the 10-meter diameter telescope of the W. M. Keck observatory of Mauna Kea on the island of Hawaii.

Gallery

References

External links 
 
 http://www.astro-tom.com/technical_data/magnitude_scale.htm

Taurus (constellation)
M-type brown dwarfs
?